Vanville is an unincorporated community in the south-east portion of Berkeley County, West Virginia, United States.  The center of the community of Vanville is at the intersection of Airport Rd, Strobridge Rd, Near Bethel's Way, and Classic Vanville Rd.

The community is named after the Vanville Church of Christ.  The church is located on the corner of Classic Vanville Rd and Airport Rd.  Part of the Eastern WV Regional Airport is located in Vanville.

Unincorporated communities in Berkeley County, West Virginia
Unincorporated communities in West Virginia